The Jidwaq is a large Somali clan, part of one of the largest Somali clans families, the Absame Darod.

Overview
The Jidwaq clan primarily inhabit the Somali Region of Ethiopia, (where they live in the Jigjiga area), the North Eastern Province of Kenya and the Jubaland region of southern Somalia (where they live south of Bu'ale). The name Jidwaaq means "the path of God" in the Somali language.

According to the UNHCR, the Jidwaq in the Somali region of Ethiopia are mostly agro-pastoralists. They often engage in agriculture but also raise livestock.

History 
The Jidwaaq (Bartire) and the Gerri have been described by The Journal of the Royal Geographical Society as the western-most branches of the Darod clan. The Bartire subclan in particular has been described as pastoralists in addition to growing coffee, as well as intermarrying with the Emirs of Harar, giving them an amount of influence.

Clan tree
There is no clear agreement on the clan and sub-clan structures and many lineages are omitted. The following listing is taken from the World Bank's Conflict in Somalia: Drivers and Dynamics from 2005 and the United Kingdom's Home Office publication, Somalia Assessment 2001.

Darod (Daarood)
Absame
Jidwaaq
Abaskuul
Yabare 
Bartire

Notable persons
Hawo Tako, Somali nationalist hero
Garad Hirsi Farah Hirsi (Wiil-Waal), The 17th Garad of the Bartire. The Jigjiga Airport (JIJ) is named after him. Many Somali folklore stories are based on his life.
Abdiwasa Abdilahi Bade, Somali academic and Ethiopian Federal Government Minister. 
Abdulfatah Abdullahi Hassan, Former Ethiopian Federal Minister for Labour, Current Ambassador to Somalia
Garad Kulmiye Mohammed Dool Wiil-Waal, The current Garad of the Absame and Bartire, Leader of the Somali Region Council of Elders
Mubashir Dubbad Raage, Former Minister of Finance, Current Minister for Security of the Somali Region.

See also
 Gidaya, ancient state in the region

References

Darod
Somali clans
Somali clans in Ethiopia